Yair Lapid
 Shai Piron
 Yael German
 Meir Cohen
 Yaakov Perry
 Ofer Shelah
 Haim Yellin
 Yoel Razvozov
 Karin Elharar
 Aliza Lavie
 Mickey Levy
 Elazar Stern
 Pnina Tamano-Shata
 Boaz Toporovsky
 Ruth Calderon
 Yifat Kariv
 Dov Lipman
 Ronen Hoffman
 Zehorit Sorek
 Ofra Finkelstein
 Hadvah Shaked
 Salim Kador
 Meiri Gadi
 Rocheliah Shapiro
 Vladimir Blake
 Sivan Bar-Or
 Gilad Sharir
 Shai Abuhatzeira
 Erez Aharoni
 Harzano Yorei Lahav
 Iti Matisyahu
 Oz Ori Naftali
 Zohar-Zigbrad Bloom
 Larissa Stadler
 Nissan Benhamou
 Rami Beja
 Devorah Biton
 Ronit Arnfreund Cohen
 Yaakov Kurtz
 Shahar Mi On
 Moran Fadlon
 Yaron-Amos Levy
 Adi Barry Cohen
 Anat Canfo
 Yariv Karin
 Naor Shiri
 Omri Nachum
 Yaara Di Segni
 Abbi Dajan
 Daniel Alberto Rains
 Sharit Handkmoff
 Uri Greenberger
 Ben Wiesel
 Dror Molho
 Hanit-Hannah Diamant Admoni
 Jasmine Skas-Friedman
 Aviva Julia Hartman
 Carmela Grabiner
 Ofrah Bell
 Abraham Doreen
 Tali Peretz
 Eitan Glick
 Michael Ben-Yishai Mahloff
 Anita Rosenbaum
 Einat Margalit Mizrahi
 Ophir Robin
 Efrat Ben-Ephraim
 Liron Ben-Tal
 Kate Julie Golit Shirel
 Hadar Aloni
 Michael Millis
 Zohar Goili
 Adi Barmoha
 Roy Konkol
 Tel Aviv Lee Vidrih
 Sharona Hershko
 Meyer Eliel
 Dafna Gazit Weiss
 Nati Avrahami
 Azriel Harizi
 Sapir Librowski
 Joel Rivlis
 Maien Gloseberg
 Tal Taasah
 Gidi Goren Graziani
 Amram Rami Lador
 Noi Alroy
 Orly Ben Zvi-Kovrinsky
 Ayel Haushner
 Shmuel Ben-Naftali
 Coral Esther Wexler
 Ayelet Segel
 Itzik Peretz
 Omri Peled
 Itzik Isaac Farkas
 Ronit Ben-Yehuda
 Aviad Cohen
 Matan Moshe Schwartz
 Deborah Weinstein
 Yaron Salah
 Robert Riesel
 Liat Tamir
 Shai Harpaz
 Michael Cabeza
 Yohanan Harel
 Yafat Morowitz
 Rubin Ruby Leon
 Sadah Or
 Daniela Bensoussan
 Ron Bleicher
 Mirit Krogliak
 Hilah Biton
 Tammy Bar-Meyer
 Rachel Dolev
 Sharit Mark Sharon
 Efrat Hachmon
 Uri Shapira
 Sheila Oshri
 Miri Melamed
 Roni Somek

External links
Central Elections Committee Official Yesh Atid List

Lists of Israeli politicians